Vilson Caković (Serbian Cyrillic: Вилсон Цаковић; born 22 February 1991) is a Serbian football goalkeeper who plays for the Swedish club Assyriska IK in the Division 1 Södra. 

He started his career in his birth town by playing for youth of Takovo, where he was spotted by Red Star Belgrade scouts. Since 2004 he has conducted his career through the youth ranks of Belgrade-based teams.

Senior career
Since 2011, he played for Serbian League Belgrade side Balkan Mirijevo with success and already has five man-of-the-match awards (four in a row, against Žarkovo, Zemun, FK Beograd and Dorćol), with average rating over 7.5. He finished the season with average rating 7.07, and became Balkan Mirijevo player of the season. After one year in Balkan, he moved to Swedish AIK Jönköping, the subsidiary of the Assyriska Föreningen that plays in Superettan. 
After a successful season in Sweden, when the club managed to gain promotion, Caković went back to Balkans. In February 2013 he signed a contract with Albanian Superliga club, Apolonia Fier.

In June 2021, Caković signed with Husqvarna FF.

Awards and honours
 Best Keeper: Europa Unita 2007, international U17 tournament in Italy.
 Best Keeper: 2008 UEFA European Under-17 Championship, in Turkey.
 Best Keeper: Lafarge Foot Avenir 2008, international U18 tournament in Limoges (France).

References 

1991 births
Living people
Serbian footballers
Association football goalkeepers
Serbian expatriate footballers
Expatriate footballers in Albania
Serbian expatriate sportspeople in Albania
FK Balkan Mirijevo players
People from Gornji Milanovac